Malé Raškovce is a village and municipality in Michalovce District in the Košice Region of eastern Slovakia.

History
In historical records the village was first mentioned in 1220.

Geography
The village lies at an altitude of 102 metres and covers an area of 8.752 km².

Infrastructure
The village has a small general shop and a small village pub.

Culture
The village has a local cultural centre, as well as a village green with a stage, a public playground and a football pitch.

Historical monuments
The village has a single church, a Reformed Church building established in 1838.

There is also a memorial to WWII victims in front of the municipal office and a memorial to the Jewish community of the village at the location of the former Jewish cemetery.

Transport
The village has two bus stops with bus shelters next to the main road, at its northern and southern end. Regular bus lines run between the village and Michalovce, and between the village and Veľké Raškovce, Vojany and Veľké Kapušany.

Gallery

See also
 List of municipalities and towns in Michalovce District
 List of municipalities and towns in Slovakia

References

External links

Official website of the municipality (English version)
Statistics about the municipality from the Urban and Municipal Statistics of the Slovak Republic database (English version)
Overview of Malé Raškovce at the e-obce.sk database (in Slovak)

Villages and municipalities in Michalovce District